Too Wild Too Long is an album by American Country music artist George Jones released in 1987 on the Epic Records label.

Background
By 1987, a new generation of country stars, such as Randy Travis, Ricky Van Shelton and Dwight Yoakam had emerged on the country music landscape. Consequently, some of the old guard were having a more difficult time remaining relevant on the charts, and this may help explain the modest showing of Jones's 47th studio album, which did not break the top ten on the Billboard albums chart and produced no hit singles.  In a review upon its release, Country Music declared that Too Wild Too Long contained too many songs that relied on the myth of George Jones rather than the kind of songs that built the myth.  Although none of the album's singles cracked the top 20, Jones's singing is characteristically stellar.  Significant tracks include a cover of the Hank Williams song "I'm a Long Gone Daddy" and "One Hell of a Song".  "The U.S.A. Today", a rare foray for the singer into the political realm, points out America's virtues and faults.  Jones also made his second music video for "The Old Man No One Loves", a tearjerker that pulls on the same heartstrings as "He Stopped Loving Her Today".

Hank Williams Jr. covered "The U.S.A. Today" on his 1990 album, Lone Wolf.

Track listing

References

External links
 George Jones' Official Website
 Record Label

1987 albums
George Jones albums
Albums produced by Billy Sherrill
Epic Records albums